Thank You is the eighth studio album by English new wave band Duran Duran. It was released on 4 April 1995 by Parlophone. Consisting of cover versions, the album performed moderately on the charts, reaching number 12 on the UK Albums Chart and number 19 on the US Billboard 200, but received negative reviews from critics.

The title track, ("Thank You", originally by Led Zeppelin) originally appeared in an edited form (5:06) on the soundtrack to the 1994 film With Honors. A still shorter edit (4:32) later appeared on Encomium: A Tribute to Led Zeppelin, a month before the full version was included on this album.

Critical reception

The two singles from the album were covers of Grandmaster Melle Mel's "White Lines (Don't Don't Do It)" and Lou Reed's "Perfect Day". "Lay Lady Lay" was a single in Italy and in Spain.

J. D. Considine of Rolling Stone said "[S]ome of the ideas at play here are stunningly wrongheaded, like the easy-listening arrangement given Elvis Costello's "Watching the Detectives" or the version of Zeppelin's "Thank You" that sounds like the band is covering Chris DeBurgh. But it takes a certain demented genius to recognize Iggy Pop's "Success" as the Gary Glitter tune it was meant to be or to redo "911 Is a Joke" so it sounds more like Beck than like Public Enemy."

In 2006, the album was declared the worst album of all time by Q magazine.

"Perfect Day" was the first single from Thank You and became a moderate hit, peaking at number 28 on the British singles chart. In the U.S. the song narrowly failed to crack the Billboard Hot 100, only reaching as high as #101 from 24 June to 8 July 1995. The B-side of the single was a version of The Velvet Underground's song "Femme Fatale", previously available in 1993, on Duran Duran's The Wedding Album.

Lou Reed said on the electronic press kit that accompanied the album that Duran Duran's version of "Perfect Day" was "The best cover ever completed of one of my own songs".

Track listing

Personnel
Duran Duran
 Warren Cuccurullo – guitar, production
 Simon Le Bon – vocals, production
 Nick Rhodes – keyboards, production
 John Taylor – bass guitar, production

Additional musicians

 Roger Taylor – drums on "Perfect Day" and "Watching the Detectives"
 Steve Ferrone – drums on "White Lines" and "Crystal Ship"
 Tony Thompson – drums on "I Wanna Take You Higher"
 Anthony J. Resta – drums on "White Lines", "Lay Lady Lay", "911 Is a Joke", "Ball of Confusion" and "I Wanna Take You Higher Again"
 Terry Bozzio – drums on "Success", "Thank You" and "Drive By"
 Abe Laboriel Jr. – drums on "Lay Lady Lay" and "I Wanna Take You Higher Again"
 John Jones - additional keyboards, guitars, and vocals
 Jonathan Elias – Moog synthesizer on "Crystal Ship"
 Bruce Dukov – violin
 Henry Ferber – violin strings
 Ron Folsom – violin strings
 Armen Garabedian – violin strings
 Berj Garabedian – violin strings
 Michelle Kikuchi-Richards – violin strings
 Joy Lyle – violin strings
 Maria Newman – violin strings
 Pamela Goldsmith – viola
 Scott Haupert – viola
 Suzi Katayama – cello
 Lee Oskar – harmonica on "Watching the Detectives" and "I Wanna Take You Higher"
 Flo & Eddie – background vocals on "Success"
 Grandmaster Flash & the Furious Five – background vocals on "White Lines" and "I Wanna Take You Higher"
 Grandmaster Melle Mel – background vocals, rapping on "White Lines"
 Curtis King – background vocals on "I Wanna Take You Higher"
 Lamya – background vocals on "White Lines" "I Wanna Take You Higher" and "Drive By"
 Maxanne Lewis – background vocals on "Ball of Confusion"
 Tessa Niles – background vocals on "Perfect Day" and "Watching the Detectives"

Technical

John Jones – producing, audio engineering, mixing, programming
Anthoy J. Resta – production, engineering, mixing, programming
Steve Churchyard – engineering
Avril McCintosh – engineering
Ken Scott – engineering
Tony Taverner – engineering
Jason Corsaro – mixing
David Richards – mixing
Tim Palmer – mixing
Bob St. John – mixing, production
 Mark Tinley – programming
 Tim Young – mastering

Charts

Certifications

References

External links

1995 albums
Albums produced by John Jones (record producer)
Capitol Records albums
Covers albums
Duran Duran albums
EMI Records albums
Parlophone albums